The spinal arteries are the:

Anterior spinal artery
Posterior spinal artery